Konstantinos Chamalidis is a Greek taekwondo athlete. He has won the national taekwondo championships.

Career 
In 2017, he competed in the men's featherweight event at the World Taekwondo Championships held in Muju, South Korea. He came second place at the 2017 Warsaw Cup.

He won a silver medal at the 2018 Mediterranean Games.

He won a bronze medal in the men's 68 kg event at the 2022 Mediterranean Games held in Oran, Algeria.

References

Greek male taekwondo practitioners
Living people
1996 births
Mediterranean Games silver medalists for Greece
Mediterranean Games bronze medalists for Greece
Mediterranean Games medalists in taekwondo
Competitors at the 2018 Mediterranean Games
Competitors at the 2022 Mediterranean Games
21st-century Greek people